The Neziner Congregation was a synagogue in the Southwark neighborhood of South Philadelphia. The congregation was founded in 1896 by immigrants from the city of Nizhyn in the Ukraine who met in members’ homes. The congregation purchased the building at 771 S 2nd Street in 1905 and held services and community events there until 1984 when it closed and merged with Temple Beth Zion-Beth Israel.

Third Baptist Church
Neziner's building at 771 S 2nd Street was erected in 1811 as a meetinghouse for the Third Baptist Church. The neighborhood was then part of the Southwark district. The church served as a hospital during the Civil War for Union soldiers returning north. Many died and were buried in the burial ground behind the building.

Neziner Synagogue, 1905-1984
Immigrants from Nizhyn, Ukraine organized the congregation in 1889. Congregation members purchased the former church building at 771 S 2nd Street in 1905. While never officially affiliating with a Jewish denomination or movement, the congregation generally identified as Conservative by the 1930s.

The congregation was active and had young people's services, drama groups, girls and boys scouts. Its sisterhood was founded in 1930.

Rabbi Alexander Levin led the shul in 1947. Samuel Shore served as Cantor in the 1950s and 1960s for 22 years. Cantor Shore was succeeded by Cantor Abraham Dubow until his passing in December 1972.

Neziner shared an annual brotherhood service with Gloria Dei (Old Swedes') Church. They held one in 1947  and again in 1949. Neziner joined Goria Dei Old Swedes in February 1954 to welcome Governor John S. Fine opening Brotherhood Week.  In February 1956, members of Old Swedes attended Neziner for Purim eve services and celebrations, and Neziner attended Old Swedes in support of Brotherhood Week.

The congregation hired Rabbi Saul Wisemon in August 1982 to serve on a part-time basis. Wisemon fled Philadelphia in April 1983 when police searched his apartment for a Torah scroll missing from the synagogue.

Neziner Legacy, 1984-present

The Neziner Congregation closed its doors in 1984 and merged into Temple Beth Zion-Beth Israel, a Conservative synagogue in the Rittenhouse Square neighborhood. Beth Zion-Beth Israel named its youth education program the Neziner Hebrew School.

The former synagogue's building was sold and converted to residential apartments in 1987.

References

External links 
 
 
 
 

Ashkenazi Jewish culture in Philadelphia
Ashkenazi synagogues
Synagogues in Philadelphia
Unaffiliated synagogues in Pennsylvania